S.A. Bachman (b. Columbus, Ohio,) is an artist, advocate and educator. She is the co-founder of the artist-activist collaboratives, Think Again and Louder Than Words. Her art practice examines the insidiousness of sexism, white privilege and conformity as well as how the mass media structures conceptions of race, class and gender. Bachman was a Senior Lecturer at The School of the Museum of Fine Arts Boston from 1991-2011 and a Senior Lecturer at Otis College of Art and Design, Los Angeles from 2009-2014. She resides in Los Angeles.

Photographic Work 
Through a confluence of image appropriation, language and monumental scale, Bachman's photomontages examine racism, sexism, and conformity. By manipulating representations of suburban malaise and out-of-context advertisements, Bachman turns the seemingly innocent, but obviously offending, image against itself. Her photographs disclose consumer appetite and the mass media's construction of gender and white privilege.

Collaboratives

Louder Than Words

Founded in 2013 with Neda Moridpour, Louder Than Words is an activist art collective that targets sexual assault, domestic violence, women and migration, LGBTQ equality, and jail reform. Bachman and Moridpour enlist art in the service of social action, civic dialogue and public address while examining how misogyny and capitalism endanger women and the disenfranchised.

Projects include: Women On the Move, a 26-foot truck transformed into a mobile billboard and resource center addressing sexual assault, harassment and domestic violence. The emphasis is on the particular challenges faced by women whose experiences are the most marginalized: those who often fear reporting due to retaliation, fraught relationships with law enforcement, stigma or fear of detention and deportation.

Louder Than Words distributes all of their posters and other printed matter free-of-charge.

Think Again

Founded with David John Attyah, Think Again (1997–2012) expects something political from art and uses images to challenge indifference. Their work — mobile billboards, outdoor projections, guerrilla interventions, digital murals, and viral poster campaigns — combines activism, cultural theory, and sociological research to create a visual language for activating civic dialogue. THINK AGAIN has explored a unique range of issues including queer liberation, economic inequality, the ways capitalist culture conspires to jeopardize the outnumbered, undocumented labor and the treatment of immigrants, racism, militarization, gentrification and displacement, and gender parity.

The collaborative views cultural work as essential to affecting social change and engaging people in the political process. Their projects privilege face-to-face interactions: handing out postcards at Pride parades, parking mobile billboards in front of City Halls and grocery stores, and sending digital posters to activists mobilizing against injustice. Their printed matter is distributed free-of-charge through art spaces, grassroots community organizations, unions and the internet. Documentation of the work of THINK AGAIN can be found here

Awards, Exhibitions, Collections 

 Awards: National Endowment for the Arts, Massachusetts Cultural Council, LEF Foundation, GUNK Foundation, Tanne Foundation, The Funding Exchange/Outfund, New England Foundation for the Arts.
 Exhibitions: Museu d´Art Contemporani de Barcelona, Institute for Contemporary Art Boston, Institute for Contemporary Art Philadelphia, The Alternative Museum, Grey Art Gallery, Exit Art, Aperture Foundation, Fabric Workshop, Philadelphia Museum of Art, Cleveland Museum of Art, DeCordova Museum and Sculpture Park.
 Collections: Los Angeles County Museum of Art, Palacio de Bellas Artes in Mexico City, Center for the Study of Political Graphics, Rose Art Museum, Glasgow Print Studio, Bell Telephone Corporation, Self Help Graphics.

References

External links
https://www.sabachman.com/

1957 births
American photographers
Living people